is a passenger railway station located in the city of Kōka, Shiga Prefecture, Japan, operated by the West Japan Railway Company (JR West).

Lines

Station layout
The station consists of one side platform serving a single bi-directional track, with an elevated station building. The station is staffed.

Platforms

History
Terashō Station opened on December 25, 1959 on the Japan National Railway (JNR). The station became part of the West Japan Railway Company on April 1, 1987 due to the privatization and dissolution of the JNR.

Passenger statistics
In fiscal 2019, the station was used by an average of 753 passengers daily (boarding passengers only).

Surrounding area
 Shiga Prefectural Konan High School
 Jizo-do (Hokukaku-do)
 Former Shiga Bank Konan Branch-Designed by Vories. Completed in 1925. Former Terashō Bank head office. 
Koga City Konan Junior High School

See also
List of railway stations in Japan

References

External links

JR West official home page

Railway stations in Shiga Prefecture
Railway stations in Japan opened in 1959
Kōka, Shiga